is a Japanese hurdler. He finished seventh in the 110 metres hurdles at the 2010 Asian Games.

Personal best

International competition

References

External links

Yuto Aoki at JAAF 

1984 births
Living people
Japanese male hurdlers
Sportspeople from Tokushima Prefecture
Athletes (track and field) at the 2010 Asian Games
Asian Games competitors for Japan
21st-century Japanese people